Results as of 11:25 PM, June 6 as reported by NJ.com (ref)

(i) = incumbent

US Senate 

Official results, New Jersey Division of Elections (PDF, July 11, 2008)

U.S. House (District 1)

U.S. House (District 5)

U.S. House (District 11)

Mayor (Atlantic City) 

2008 New Jersey elections